Mike Ladd is an American hip hop musician from Boston, Massachusetts. He is based in Paris, France. The Guardian described him as "the king of the hip-hop concept."

Early life
Mike Ladd was born in Boston, Massachusetts. As a child, he lived in India and Zimbabwe for a while. He graduated from Hampshire College.

Career
Mike Ladd's debut studio album, Easy Listening 4 Armageddon, was released in 1997. He released Welcome to the Afterfuture in 2000. Nostalgialator was released in 2004. In 2005, he released Negrophilia: The Album, which was inspired by Petrine Archer-Straw's book of the same name. In that year, he also released Father Divine on ROIR. He has also released several collaborative albums with jazz pianist Vijay Iyer.

Style and influences
Mike Ladd's influences range from Funkadelic to King Tubby, Minor Threat, and Charles Stepney.

Discography

Studio albums
 Easy Listening 4 Armageddon (1997)
 Welcome to the Afterfuture (2000)
 Gun Hill Road (2000) 
 Beauty Party (2003) 
 In What Language? (2003) 
 Nostalgialator (2004)
 Negrophilia: The Album (2005)
 Father Divine (2005)
 Still Life with Commentator (2007) 
 Maison Hantée (2008) 
 Anarchist Republic of Bzzz (2009) 
 Bedford Park (2010) 
 Why Waste Time (2012) 
 Holding It Down: The Veterans' Dreams Project (2013) 
 Gain (2016) 
 Epiphany (2017) 
 La chose commune (2017) 
 Visions of Selam (2018) 
 The Dead Can Rap (2020)

Live albums
 Live from Paris (2000)

EPs
 Vernacular Homicide (2001)
 Kids and Animals (2011)

Singles
 "Blah Blah" (1998)
 "5000 Miles" / "Planet 10" (2000)
 "Activator Cowboy" (2001)
 "Wild Out Day" / "Jet Pack" (2003)
 "Housewives at Play" (2004)
 "Shake It" (2004)

Guest appearances
 Youngblood Brass Band - "Peace" from Unlearn (2000)
 Mr. Flash - "Basementized Soul" from Le Voyage Fantastique (2001)
 Thawfor - "Where Thawght Is Worshipped 2.2" from Where Thawght Is Worshiped (2001)
 The Opus - "Where Thawght Is Worshipped 3.0" from 0.0.0. (2002)
 Terranova - "Sublime" and "Heroes" from Hitchhiking Non-Stop with No Particular Destination (2002)
 Emmanuel Santarromana - "Les Halles" from Métropolitain (2003)
 Huge Voodoo - "NYPD Blues" from Affordable Magic (2003)
 Sonic Sum - "Films" from Films (2004)
 Jackson and His Computerband - "TV Dogs (Cathodica's Letter)" from Smash (2005)
 Daedelus - "Welcome Home" from Exquisite Corpse (2005)
 Stacs of Stamina - "Baghdad Boogie" from Tivoli (2005)
 Blue Sky Black Death - "Long Division" from A Heap of Broken Images (2006)
 Coldcut - "Everything Is Under Control" from Sound Mirrors (2006) 
 Soylent Green - "Eating People" from Software and Hardwar (2006)
 dDamage - "Alphabet & Burners" from Shimmy Shimmy Blade (2006)
 Mister Modo & Ugly Mac Beer - "Machiavelli vs. Lao Tseu" and "Machiavelli vs. Lao Tseu (Remix)" from Mo' Dougly Weird Stories (2007)
 Apollo Heights - "Missed Again" from Disco Lights (2007)
 Grand Pianoramax - "Showdown" from The Biggest Piano in Town (2008)
 Arsenal - "Turn Me Loose" from Lotuk (2008)
 Solex vs. Cristina Martinez & Jon Spencer - "R Is for Ring-A-Ding" and "Action" from Amsterdam Throwdown King Street Showdown! (2009)
 Mister Modo & Ugly Mac Beer with Jessica Fitoussi - "Dirty Finders" from Modonut (2009)
 DJ Spooky - "Known Unknowns" from The Secret Song (2009)
 U-God - "Lipton" from Dopium (2009)
 Mister Modo & Ugly Mac Beer - "Norman Bates" from Remi Domost (2010)
 Walker Barnard - "Ooty on Wax" and "Ooty on Wax (Iron Curtis Remix)" from Alacazam (2011)
 Grand Pianoramax - "Domestic Bliss" from Smooth Danger (2011)
 Birdapres - "Not the Only Man" from Catch an L (2011)
 Busdriver - "Electric Blue" from Beaus$Eros (2012)
 Mister Modo & Ugly Mac Beer - "Life at the 9th" from Modonut 2 (2012)
 Roberto Fonseca - "Mi Negra Ave Maria" from Yo (2012)
 Ben Muller - "The Last One to Preach" (2013)
 Mister Modo & Ugly Mac Beer - "Wild Gun Mike" from Modonut Invasion (2013)
 Dr. John - "Mack the Knife" from Ske-Dat-De-Dat: The Spirit of Satch (2014)
 Nevche - "Rendez-Nous L'Argent" from Rétroviseur (2014)
 Uncommon Nasa - "Black Hole" from Written at Night (2017)
 R.A.P. Ferreira - "An Idea Is a Work of Art" from Purple Moonlight Pages (2020)
 Billy Woods - "Christine" from Aethiopes (2022)

Remixes
 Enrico Macias - "Le Vent Du Sud (Mike Ladd Remix)" from Enrico Experience (2000)
 Yo La Tengo - "Nuclear War (Version 4)" (2002)
 Antipop Consortium - "Ghostlawns (Mike Ladd Mix)" (2002)
 Yameen - "Spirit Walker (Mike Ladd Remix)" from Never Knows More (2009)

References

External links
 
 

Living people
Year of birth missing (living people)
Hampshire College alumni
Rappers from Boston
American rappers
American male rappers
21st-century American rappers
American spoken word artists
Hip hop record producers
Big Dada artists
Definitive Jux artists
ROIR artists
Thirsty Ear Recordings artists
21st-century American male musicians